Chieri railway station serves the town and comune of Chieri, in the Piedmont region, northwestern Italy.

Services

Railway stations in the Metropolitan City of Turin
Railway stations opened in 1874
Chieri